Dick Proceviat (born June 25, 1946) is a retired professional ice hockey player who played 321 games in the World Hockey Association.  He played for the  Chicago Cougars and Indianapolis Racers.

Proceviat was born in Whitemouth, Manitoba.

External links

1946 births
Living people
Canadian ice hockey defencemen
Chicago Cougars players
Ice hockey people from Manitoba
Indianapolis Racers players
Long Island Cougars players